Northern Michigan University (Northern Michigan, Northern or NMU) is a public university in Marquette, Michigan. It was established in 1899 by the Michigan Legislature as Northern State Normal School. In 1963, the state designated Northern a university and gave the school its current name of Northern Michigan University.

The university comprises five academic divisions, offering some 180 programs at the undergraduate and graduate levels. Accredited undergraduate and graduate degree programs are offered by the College of Arts and Sciences, the College of Business, the College of Health Sciences and Professional Studies.

NMU's athletic teams are nicknamed the Wildcats and compete primarily in the NCAA Division II Great Lakes Intercollegiate Athletic Conference (GLIAC). The hockey team competes in NCAA Division I Central Collegiate Hockey Association. The Nordic ski team competes in the NCAA Central Collegiate Ski Association.

History
Northern Michigan University was established in 1899 by the Michigan Legislature as Northern State Normal School to offer teacher preparation programs in Michigan's then-wild and sparsely populated Upper Peninsula. When it opened in 1899, NMU enrolled thirty-two students who were taught by six faculty members in rented rooms in Marquette city hall. The original  campus site at the corner of Presque Isle and Kaye Avenues was on land donated by local businessman and philanthropist John M. Longyear, whose namesake academic building, Longyear Hall, opened in 1900.

Throughout the school's first half-century, education and teacher training was the school's primary focus. During this time, the school built the native sandstone buildings Kaye and Peter White Halls, as well as a manual training school next to the campus buildings, J.D. Pierce School. Modest enrollment increases led to several name changes:

Northern State Normal, 1899
Northern State Teachers College, 1927
Northern Michigan College of Education, 1942
Northern Michigan College, 1955
In 1963, through the adoption of a new state constitution in Michigan, Northern Michigan was designated a comprehensive university serving the diverse educational needs of Upper Michigan. During this time, enrollment grew, due in large part to the 1957 opening of the Mackinac Bridge that links the Upper and Lower Peninsulas. Accredited undergraduate and graduate degree programs are offered by the College of Arts and Sciences, the College of Business, the College of Health Sciences and Professional Studies.

Graduate education began in March 1935 when courses at the master's degree level were offered in cooperation with the University of Michigan.

Academics

Admissions 

NMU is considered "selective" by U.S. News & World Report. For the Class of 2025 (enrolling Fall 2021), NMU received 6,553 applications and accepted 4,670 (71.3%), with 1,496 enrolling.

The enrolled first-year class of 2023 had the following standardized test scores: the middle 50% range (25th percentile-75th percentile) of SAT scores was 980-1180, while the middle 50% range of ACT scores was 20-26.

Academic divisions

180 Undergraduate and graduate degree programs are offered at NMU.

NMU has five academic divisions:

 College of Academic Information Services: Beaumier Heritage Center
 College of Arts and Sciences: School of Art and Design, Center for Economic Education and Entrepreneurship, Center for Native American Studies, Center for Upper Peninsula Studies
 Walker L. Cisler College of Business (named for philanthropist Walker Lee Cisler)
 Graduate Education and Research
 College of Health Sciences and Professional Studies: School of Clinical Sciences, School of Education, Leadership and Public Service, School of Health and Human Performance, School of Nursing

Northern's most popular undergraduate majors, by 2021 graduates, were:
Registered Nursing/Registered Nurse (105)
Biology/Biological Sciences (95)
Art/Art Studies (67)
Criminal Justice/Safety Studies (55)
Psychology (49)
Elementary Education and Teaching (44)

Accreditation
Northern Michigan University is accredited by the Higher Learning Commission.

All education programs are accredited by the Teacher Education Accreditation Council (TEAC). Other accreditations include the Accreditation Board for Engineering and Technology; American Alliance for Health, Physical Education, Recreation and Dance; American Chemical Society; American Society of Cytology; Commission on Accreditation of Allied Health Education Professionals (Surgical Technology); Committee on Accreditation for Respiratory Care of the Commission on Accreditation of Allied Health Education Programs; Council on Social Work Education; Department of Transportation Federal Aviation Administration Certification; International Association of Counseling Services, Inc.; Joint Review Committee on Education in Radiologic Technology; Michigan Department of Licensing and Regulation, State Board of Nursing; National Accrediting Agency for Clinical Laboratory Sciences; and the National Association of Schools of Music.

In addition, the nursing programs (practical nursing, baccalaureate, and master's degrees) are fully approved by the Michigan Department of Licensing and Regulation, State Board of Nursing and the baccalaureate and master's degrees are fully accredited by the Commission on Collegiate Nursing Education (CCNE).

The baccalaureate degree programs of the Walker L. Cisler College of Business are accredited by the Association to Advance Collegiate Schools of Business.

Campus

NMU is a tobacco-free campus.

Instructional Spaces

Ten buildings where classes are held having at least 210 instructional spaces. There are 3 distance learning facilities, the largest of which is Mead Auditorium which seats 100.

Art and Design

The DeVos Art Museum displays 10–12 exhibitions per year of contemporary international, national, regional, and local art. At over  it is the largest art gallery on campus and the only art museum with a permanent collection in the Upper Peninsula.

Berry Events Center

 Northern's multi-purpose student events center, is the home of the Northern Michigan University hockey and men's and women's basketball teams. The  facility contains an Olympic-size (200 ft. x 100 ft.) ice sheet and seats over 4,000 for hockey events. The Berry Events Center was built on the site of the former Memorial Stadium.

Cohodas Hall

 The tallest building on campus, Cohodas Hall houses administrative offices and the College of Business. Completed in 1975, the building stands on the site of Northern's original campus. It is named after U.P. banker and philanthropist Sam M. Cohodas.

Forest Roberts Theatre

 The 500-seat Forest Roberts Theatre is named after a former head of the Speech department. The theatre has a computerized lighting system and modern sound system. Major theatrical productions are held year-round in this facility.

Gries Hall

 A former residence hall, Gries is now home to the Military Science, History, Political Science, and Economics departments, along with the Alumni Association offices and the Beaumier U.P. Heritage Center. The Ada B. Vielmetti Health Center on the first floor provides family health care and pharmacy services to students and staff.

CB Hedgcock Building

 The CB Hedgcock building was completely renovated from a field house to a student service center in 2004. It now houses the offices of the Dean of Students, Admissions, Registrar, Financial Aid, Housing and Residence Life, Multicultural Education, and other student services. Also located in Hedgcock is the Reynolds Recital Hall, a 303-seat concert hall.

Jamrich Hall

 Jamrich Hall, opened in the fall of 2014, contains numerous large lecture halls and smaller classrooms. The primary classroom building on campus, this building is named for former university president John X. Jamrich. The current Jamrich Hall replaced a prior Jamrich Hall which was built in 1968. The older Jamrich was demolished after the completion of the new building. The hall houses five academic department offices: English, criminal justice, sociology and anthropology, social work and math and computer science.

Lydia M. Olson Library

 The Lydia M. Olson Library, located within the Edgar L. Harden Learning Resource Center (LRC), houses a volume count of 544,219 titles and 29,365 of periodical subscriptions.

McClintock Hall

 The building features a Black Box Theatre for student-directed productions and audio laboratories, as well as general classrooms.

Physical Education Instructional Facility

 Physical Education Instructional Facility (PEIF) opened in 1976.  The facility houses the PEIF Pool, and the Vandament Arena, home of Wildcat volleyball. Also housed within the PEIF is a recreation center with a climbing wall, weight room, basketball courts, spinning room, seven racquetball courts, a dance studio, and various classrooms.
Seaborg Science Complex

 The Seaborg Science Complex comprises West Science and Kathleen Shingler Weston Hall (formerly the New Science Facility). This facility is the home to the natural, physical and health science departments. The complex is named after Glenn Seaborg, an Upper Peninsula native.

Superior Dome

 The Superior Dome is the largest wooden dome in the world and is home to the NMU athletic department. The NMU football and other athletic teams play home games there. Seating capacity is 8,000 but can be rearranged to seat 16,000.

The Jacobetti Center

 The Jacobetti Center is home to the Continuing Education and Workforce Development, which includes two departments: Engineering Technology and Technology and Occupational Sciences.  A large lobby area, known as "the commons," provides tables and seating for studying, discussions or enjoying food from the student-run Culinary Café. The upscale Chez Nous restaurant in the center serves as a training ground for cooking and hospitality services. The center is named for longtime Upper Peninsula State Representative Dominic J. Jacobetti.

Whitman Hall

 This facility contains the Dean of Health Sciences and Professional Studies, the School of Education, Leadership and Public Service, the Modern Languages and Literatures Department and the Center for Native American Studies. Before being purchased by the university in 2002, the building was home to an elementary school.

Governance
Northern Michigan University's eight-member governing board, the Board of Trustees, is appointed by the Governor of Michigan and confirmed by the Michigan Senate for an eight-year term. The Board of Trustees has general supervision of the institution, the control and direction of all expenditures from the institution's funds, and such other powers and duties as prescribed by law. It also has the authority to hire and evaluate the university president, who reports directly to the board. Members of the Board of Trustees serve without compensation, but are reimbursed by the University for expenses related to Board duties.

Athletics

NMU's Wildcats compete in the NCAA's Division II Great Lakes Intercollegiate Athletic Conference in basketball, football, golf, cross country, soccer, volleyball, track & field, and swimming/diving. The hockey program competes in Division I as a member of the Central Collegiate Hockey Association. The Nordic ski team competes in the Central Collegiate Ski Association. The Division II football team plays in the world's largest wooden dome, the Superior Dome. Lloyd Carr, former head coach at the University of Michigan, former NFL coach Jerry Glanville, and Steve Mariucci, former head coach of the Detroit Lions and San Francisco 49ers and Robert Saleh, current head coach of the New York Jets, played football for NMU, and current Michigan State coach Tom Izzo played basketball at NMU. Northern Michigan's rivals in sports action are the two other major schools in the Upper Peninsula: Michigan Technological University, and Lake Superior State University.

The winner of the annual football game between NMU and Michigan Tech is awarded the Miner's Cup.

Olympic Training Site
The United States Olympic Training Site on the campus of Northern Michigan University is one of 16 Olympic training sites in the country.  The NMU-OTS provides secondary and post-secondary educational opportunities for athletes while offering world-class training.

With more than 70 resident athletes and coaches, the NMU-OTS is the second-largest Olympic training center in the United States, in terms of residents, behind Colorado Springs. The USOEC has more residential athletes than the Lake Placid and Chula Vista sites combined. Over the years, it has grown into a major contributor to the U.S. Olympic movement.

Current resident training programs include Greco-Roman wrestling and weightlifting. Athletes must be approved by the NMU-OTS, their national governing body and NMU to be admitted into the program.

NMU-OTS athletes attend NMU while training in their respective sports, and are officially recognized as NMU varsity athletes. The student athletes receive free or reduced room and board, access to training facilities as well as sports medicine and sports science services, academic tutoring, and a waiver of out-of-state tuition fees by NMU. Although athletes are responsible for tuition at the in-state rate, they may receive the B.J. Stupak Scholarship to help cover expenses.

On-campus NMU-OTS athletes live in NMU's  Meyland Hall, eat in campus dining halls, and train at the university's Superior Dome.

The NMU-OTS also offers a variety of short-term training camps; regional, national, and international competitions; coaches and officials education clinics; and an educational program for retired Olympians.

Student life

Residential life
The on campus residence halls include:
 Birch Hall (Part of The Woods complex)
 Cedar Hall (Part of The Woods complex)
 Maple Hall (Part of The Woods complex)
 Hunt Hall (Down Campus)
 Magers Hall (Down Campus)
 Meyland Hall (Down Campus)
 Spalding Hall (Down Campus)
 Spooner Hall (Up Campus)
 VanAntwerp Hall (Down Campus)

In addition to the residence halls, NMU operates and maintains four apartment buildings on campus.

The apartments are 

 Woodland Park (Opened in 2006)
 Lincoln Apartments
 Center / Norwood Apartments
 Norwood Apartments

Groups and activities

Student organizations
NMU hosts a large number of student organizations which are governmental, academic, programming, social, religious, and athletic, as well as residence hall-related, in nature. There are over 300 registered student organizations that provide programs and activities for the campus community.

Army ROTC
NMU hosts the United States Army Cadet Command's "Wildcat Battalion". Roughly 70 Cadets train to earn their commissions as United States Army Officers in both the Active Duty and Reserve components.

Greek life
 Fraternities
Alpha Sigma Phi
Tau Kappa Epsilon

Sororities
Alpha Gamma Delta
Kappa Beta Gamma
Phi Sigma Sigma

The North Wind
The North Wind began in 1972 as Northern Michigan University's second independent, student newspaper. The university's first newspaper was The Northern News, which was shut down due to published articles throughout the 1960s that painted the school in an unflattering manner. In 2015, a controversy arose between the school's administration and members of the North Wind staff, which reached federal court on claims of first amendment violations before the case was dismissed. The weekly paper covers news from the university and community alike and prints on most Wednesdays during the school year.

WUPX
WUPX is Northern Michigan University's non-commercial, student run, radio station broadcasting at 91.5 FM.  WUPX provides NMU Students and the Marquette area with a wide variety of music, event announcements, and activities.

Notable alumni

Nick Baumgartner, Winter X Games gold medalist in 2011 Snowboard Cross event, Olympian
Robert Saleh, NFL Head Coach, New York Jets
Chad Gable, Greco-Roman wrestler, professional wrestler signed to WWE on the Raw brand 
Andy Bisek, Greco-Roman wrestler
Steve Bozek, NHL player, Calgary Flames, San Jose Sharks
Timothy Bradley, professional boxer, welterweight and junior-welterweight champion
Jason Cameron, actor and personal trainer; formerly of While You Were Out, currently affiliated with DIY Network
Bob Chase, play-by-play announcer for Fort Wayne Komets
Cornelius Coe, football player
Shani Davis, Olympic speed skater; first black athlete from any nation to win gold medal in individual Winter Olympics sport
Lloyd Carr, former head football coach, University of Michigan
Dallas Drake, hockey player, won Stanley Cup with Detroit Red Wings in 2008; former captain of St. Louis Blues
Vernon Forrest, professional boxer, welterweight and light-heavyweight champion
Jerry Glanville, head coach of NFL's Houston Oilers and Atlanta Falcons; also of Portland State University
Caitlin Compton Gregg, cross-country skier, took bronze in 2015 World Ski Championships
Erik Gustafsson, hockey player for Philadelphia Flyers
Sheila E. Hixson, member of the Maryland House of Delegates
John D. Holum, Under Secretary of State for Arms Control and International Security under Bill Clinton.
Tom Izzo, men's basketball coach, Michigan State University
Bobby Jurasin, CFL player for Saskatchewan Roughriders, and Toronto Argonauts
Bob Kroll,  NFL player for Green Bay Packers
Tom Laidlaw, NHL player
John Lautner, modern architect
Mark Maddox, NFL player for Buffalo Bills
Justin Marlowe, professor of public finance at the University of Washington
Helen Maroulis, first American gold medalist in Olympic women's freestyle wrestling (2016)
Steve Mariucci, head coach of Detroit Lions, San Francisco 49ers, and University of California
Randi Miller, Bronze medalist in Olympic women's freestyle wrestling (2008)
Jason Morgan, Representative-elect for Michigan House of Representatives District 23 and Northern Michigan University Trustee.
Mark Olver, hockey player for Colorado Avalanche
Nathan Oystrick, hockey player for Phoenix Coyotes
David Prychitko, researcher, author and professor of economics at Northern Michigan University.
Mike Santorelli, hockey player for Vancouver Canucks
Howard Schultz, CEO and Chairman of Starbucks
Dave Siciliano, ice hockey coach and player, Master of Physical Education degree
Joseph A. Strohl, former member of the Wisconsin State Senate
Jackie Swanson, actress, television series Cheers, films including Lethal Weapon and numerous TV commercials
Brian Viloria, professional boxer
Don Waddell, NHL player and coach
Ed Ward, hockey player for Calgary Flames
Steve Weeks, NHL player, New York Rangers, Vancouver Canucks
Steven Wiig, actor (Into the Wild) and musician
DaVarryl Williamson, professional boxer, Colorado Golden Gloves Hall of Fame member
Jerry Woods, NFL player for Green Bay Packers

Charter schools
NMU operates seven charter schools throughout Michigan.

 Bahweting Anishnabe Public School in Sault Ste. Marie.
 Burton Glen Charter Academic in Burton.
 Nah Tah Wahsh Public School Academy in Wilson.
 North Star Academy in Marquette.
 Walton Charter Academy in Pontiac.
 Experiencia Preparatory Charter Academy in Detroit.
 Southpointe Scholars Charter Academy in Ypsilanti.

As of July 1, 2014, NMU added three more charter schools:  Frances Reh Academy in Saginaw, George Crockett Academy in Detroit and East Shore Leadership Academy in Port Huron.

References

Further reading

External links
 
 Northern Michigan Athletics website

 
Public universities and colleges in Michigan
Marquette, Michigan
Educational institutions established in 1899
1899 establishments in Michigan
Education in Marquette County, Michigan
Universities and colleges accredited by the Higher Learning Commission